Ben Lomond is a rhyolite lava dome near Lake Taupo in New Zealand's North Island. Located about eight kilometres north-northeast of Kinloch, it rises to a height of 744 metres above sea level.

Ben Lomond erupted about 100,000 years ago, producing two lava lobes that flowed around 3.5 kilometres south and southwest from a vent about one kilometre south of Poihipi Road. Much of the lava formed grey banded obsidian as it cooled. Crystalline rhyolite and pumice were also produced.

References
 
 

Taupō Volcanic Zone
Pleistocene lava domes
Volcanoes of Waikato